William Nicholas Stone Courtney (16 December 1929 – 22 February 2011) was an Egyptian-born British actor. He was known for his long-running role as Brigadier Lethbridge-Stewart in the BBC science fiction television series Doctor Who.

Early life
Courtney was born in Cairo, Egypt, the son of a British diplomat father and half-American mother. His paternal grandfather was the journalist William Leonard Courtney.

He was educated in France, Kenya and Egypt. On his maternal side, Courtney was descended from New Zealand politician John Cuff. He did his national service in the British Army, leaving after 18 months as a private, not wanting to pursue a military career. He moved to England to join London's Webber Douglas Academy of Dramatic Art. After two years doing repertory theatre in Northampton, he became resident in London in 1961.

Courtney's first television work was in the 1957 series Escape. He made guest appearances in several cult television series, including The Avengers (1962, 1967), The Champions (1968), Randall and Hopkirk (1969) and as a racing driver in Riviera Police (1965), and briefly appeared as a TV panel chairman in the film Take a Girl Like You (1970), hosting a debate between John Bird and John Fortune.

Doctor Who
Director Douglas Camfield originally considered Courtney for the role of Richard the Lionheart in the Doctor Who serial The Crusade (1965), a role that ultimately went to Julian Glover. Camfield made sure to keep Courtney in mind for future casting, however. Courtney made his first appearance in the series when Camfield cast him in the 1965 serial The Daleks' Master Plan, where he played Space Security Agent Bret Vyon opposite William Hartnell as the First Doctor.

Camfield liked Courtney's performance, and when the director was assigned the 1968 serial The Web of Fear, he cast Courtney as Captain Knight. However, when David Langton gave up the role of Colonel Lethbridge-Stewart to work elsewhere, Camfield recast Captain Knight and gave the part to Courtney instead. The Lethbridge-Stewart character returned in the next season in "The Invasion", promoted to the rank of brigadier, and in charge of the British contingent of UNIT. The organisation had been charged with protecting the Earth from alien invasion. Years later actor and writer Ian Marter (who played UNIT medical officer Harry Sullivan alongside Tom Baker) named a Russian military base used in The Invasion, but unnamed on screen, "Nykortny" in his novelisation of the story.

In this recurring role, he appeared semi-regularly in 101 episodes between 1970 and 1975. The character proved popular enough to return in 1983, first in Mawdryn Undead and in the official 20th anniversary special The Five Doctors. Courtney made his final appearance in the 1989 serial Battlefield (although like many other former cast members, he reprised the role for the charity special Dimensions in Time). He appeared with Jean Marsh in both his first and last regular Doctor Who television appearances. Jean Marsh portrayed the character of Sara Kingdom in Courtney's first appearance, The Daleks' Master Plan, playing his character's sister. In Courtney's final appearance on the show, Marsh portrayed the villainous Morgaine in the Arthurian-inspired Battlefield. Marsh also appeared in the earlier story The Crusade for which Courtney had been considered.
Courtney played Lethbridge-Stewart, either on television or in spin-off audio plays, alongside every subsequent Doctor up to and including Paul McGann, as well as substitute First Doctor Richard Hurndall. He did not act in the revived series, although he did so in the spin-off, The Sarah Jane Adventures and appeared in archival footage in Doctor Who proper. While he acted with Tenth Doctor actor David Tennant in the Big Finish audio dramas Sympathy for the Devil and UNIT: The Wasting, Tennant was playing a different character, Colonel Ross Brimmicombe-Wood, on both occasions.

Fifteen years after Dimensions in Time, Courtney returned as Lethbridge-Stewart (now, Sir Alistair), freshly returned from Peru, in Enemy of the Bane, a two-part story in the Doctor Who spin-off The Sarah Jane Adventures aired in December 2008, starring Elisabeth Sladen as Sarah Jane Smith. The Sarah Jane Adventures production team intended that Courtney would reappear in the following year's The Wedding of Sarah Jane Smith so that Lethbridge-Stewart would meet the Tenth Doctor, but Courtney was recovering from a stroke and unable to take part.

Following Courtney's 22 February 2011 death, Lethbridge-Stewart was written out as having also died; when the Eleventh Doctor wanted to contact him in "The Wedding of River Song", he was informed that Sir Alistair has died some months earlier at his nursing home. The Brigadier was mentioned several times in the series's golden anniversary episode, "The Day of the Doctor", and quoted once; and, with a prominent close-up of his archival portrait, Courtney is the only individual to appear in all the Doctor Who anniversary stories prior to "The Day of the Doctor".

In a 2008 interview, Courtney criticised the pacing of the new series of Doctor Who, saying: "It’s all a bit rushed sometimes. It’s a heck of a lot to get in in three quarters of an hour, the whole story. In the old days, it used to be half an hour every Saturday for four Saturdays, or six Saturdays, so it does all seem to be a bit of a rush. In fact, it leaves me rather gasping for breath sometimes." Courtney also commented: "I think people’s attention span is more limited than it used to be."

After Doctor Who

Courtney continued to act extensively in theatre and television after his main Doctor Who appearances, guest-starring in television programmes including Whodunnit? in 1977, where he appeared again with Jon Pertwee, Minder (1984), All Creatures Great and Small (1980, episode "Matters of Life And Death"), Only Fools and Horses (1988) and Yes, Prime Minister (1986), and the 1984 television movie To Catch a King. In 1982 he was cast alongside Frankie Howerd in the World War II-set comedy series Then Churchill Said to Me but the series remained untransmitted for over a decade due to the outbreak of the Falklands War. He also had a regular role in the comedy French Fields between 1989 and 1991.

He also appeared in an episode of the long-running BBC TV series The Two Ronnies alongside Ronnie Barker and Ronnie Corbett as the character of 'Captain Dickie Chapman', a fellow prisoner-of-war (POW) in Colditz during World War II, in a sketch based on the original BBC serial, Colditz.

In 1985, Courtney played 'The Narrator' in The Rocky Horror Show. Amanda Redman also starred in the production as Janet. In 1989 he portrayed Temple in the BBC Radio 4 adaption of John Wyndham's Survival. He also appeared briefly in the 1990 film Bullseye!, directed by Michael Winner.

He also appeared in the Big Finish Productions audio drama Earthsearch Mindwarp, based on a James Follett novel, broadcast on the digital radio station BBC 7. Courtney starred as Inspector Lionheart opposite fellow Doctor Who actor Terry Molloy in the audio series The Scarifyers, from Cosmic Hobo Productions. The first two Scarifyers adventures, The Nazad Conspiracy and The Devil of Denge Marsh, were broadcast on BBC 7 in 2007; the third, entitled For King and Country in 2008, and fourth, The Curse of the Black Comet, in 2010. He also appeared in three episodes of Kaldor City as the newscaster Danl Packard. He regularly made personal appearances at science fiction conventions and in 1997 was made the honorary president of the Doctor Who Appreciation Society. Courtney also appeared in BBC Radio 4's five part chilling radio drama "Outbreak of Fear" by R.D. Wingfield in the 1980s (repeated on BBC Radio 4 Extra up to August 2017 in stereo only on TV and online - not DAB).

In 1998, Courtney released his autobiography, titled Five Rounds Rapid! after a line of dialogue the Brigadier had in the 1971 Doctor Who serial The Dæmons. He recorded his memoirs, subtitled A Soldier in Time for release on CD in 2002 by Big Finish. In 2008 he appeared in the film Incendiary, as the Archbishop of Canterbury, alongside Ewan McGregor.

An updated autobiography, Still Getting Away With It, was published in 2005, with co-author Michael McManus.

Death
Courtney's death was reported by SFX and The Stage early in the morning of 23 February 2011. Doctor Who audio play producers Big Finish, with whom Courtney had worked on several releases in his continuing role as the Brigadier, confirmed the date of his death as 22 February 2011. The BBC reported that he had "died in London at the age of 81". According to his official website, he died following a long illness. Doctor Who writer Mark Gatiss called him "a childhood hero and the sweetest of gentlemen". Former Doctor Who co-star Tom Baker also paid tribute, having visited him on the Friday before his death. Baker wrote "We shall miss him terribly" in a newsletter on his website, in which he also indicated that Courtney had been battling cancer.

Filmography

Film

Television

Notes

References

External links

Obituary in The Guardian
Obituary in The Independent
Obituary in The Telegraph
Doctor Who 'Brigadier' Nicholas Courtney dies aged 81, BBC News

1929 births
2011 deaths
20th-century British Army personnel
20th-century British male actors
21st-century British male actors
Alumni of the Webber Douglas Academy of Dramatic Art
British male film actors
British male television actors
British male voice actors
British people of New Zealand descent
Deaths from cancer in England
Male actors from Cairo
Male actors from London